is a Japanese comedian, actress and graduate student.

Edo Harumi is represented with Yoshimoto Kogyo in Tokyo (also known as Tokyo Yoshimoto, a subsidiary of Yoshimoto Creative Agency).

She spent her childhood in Ibaraki Prefecture, Chiba Prefecture and Tokyo. Edo Harumi graduated from Meiji University Faculty of Literature Department of Literature Department of Drama Studies.

Filmography

Variety
Regular

Current appearances

TV dramas

Anime television

TV shopping

Radio

Stage

Narration

Broadband

Magazines

Films

Advertisements

Music videos

Discography and bibliography

CD

DVD

Books

Notes, References

Notes

References

External links
 

Japanese women comedians
Meiji University alumni
Actresses from Tokyo
Comedians from Tokyo
1964 births
Living people